Greece is represented in Venezuela through its embassy in Caracas and an honorary consulate in Maracaibo. Venezuela has an embassy in Athens and an honorary consulate in Piraeus. Both countries are full members of the United Nations.

Greek community of Venezuela
Data of Consular Office in Venezuela estimates that the Greek community has an approximate population of 3000 people, with the majority working in trade, financial and business activities. There are organized Greek communities mostly in Caracas and smaller ones in Valencia, where the Greek language is taught and Greek Orthodox churches operate.

Recent relations 

In February 2019, the Greek government, led by left-wing prime minister Alexis Tsipras, refused to follow most of the Western world, refusing to recognize opposition leader Juan Guaido as interim president of Venezuela. In July 2019, the centre-right successor of Tsipras, Prime Minister Kyriakos Mitsotakis, recognized Venezuelan opposition leader Juan Guaido as the interim president of his country.

In August 2019, the Venezuelan Parliament, led by interim President of Venezuela Juan Guaido appointed Eduardo Massieu Paredes as Venezuelan Ambassador to Greece.  Following this appointment, the Prime Minister of Greece and President of Venezuela met in January 2020 in Davos, Switzerland marking the first time the acting Heads of Government of both nations held an in-person meeting. Subsequently, Foreign Affairs Minister Nikos Dendias met via videoconference with Guaido at the end of 2020.

See also 
 Greeks in Venezuela

References

External links
 Greek Ministry of Foreign Affairs about relations with Venezuela

 

 
Venezuela
Greece